Anarsia conica is a moth in the family Gelechiidae. It was described by Kyu-Tek Park and Margarita Gennadievna Ponomarenko in 1996. It is found in Thailand.

The wingspan is 10-10.5 mm. The forewings are pale orange grey, speckled with dark grey scales. The costal mark is elongate and preceded by three small, obscure streaks along the margin and followed by two streaks. The hindwings are pale grey.

References

conica
Moths described in 1996
Moths of Asia